The canton of Montélimar-2 is an administrative division of the Drôme department, southeastern France. Its borders were modified at the French canton reorganisation which came into effect in March 2015. Its seat is in Montélimar.

It consists of the following communes:
Allan
Châteauneuf-du-Rhône
Espeluche
Montboucher-sur-Jabron
Montélimar (partly)

References

Cantons of Drôme